Ghanim Mahmoud is an Iraqi sprinter. He competed in the men's 4 × 100 metres relay at the 1960 Summer Olympics.

References

External links
 

Year of birth missing (living people)
Living people
Athletes (track and field) at the 1960 Summer Olympics
Iraqi male sprinters
Olympic athletes of Iraq
Place of birth missing (living people)